is a Japanese manga series written and illustrated by Shūzō Oshimi. It was serialized in Futabasha's  Manga Action from March 2012 to September 2016, and published in nine volumes. A TV drama adaptation from Fuji TV was released in March 2017.

Plot
The basic premise involves a college dropout who wakes up in the body of a high-school girl.

Media

Manga
The series is written and illustrated by Shūzō Oshimi. It started serialization in Manga Action on March 6, 2012. The series ended in Manga Action on September 6, 2016. The series was published in nine tankōbon volumes.

In January 2014, Crunchyroll announced they would release chapters of the series simultaneously with the Japanese release on their Crunchyroll Manga service. In August 2018, Denpa announced they licensed the series for digital and print releases.

Volume list

TV drama
A live-action TV drama adaptation was announced by Fuji TV in March 2017. It was eight episodes in length and was released on Fuji TV's streaming service on March 31, 2017. The series was directed by Sumisu, Hatsuki Yokoo, and Hiroto Totsuka, with Yūko Shimoda writing the scripts, and Shiggy Jr. performing the main theme. Elaiza Ikeda and Ryo Yoshizawa performed the lead roles.

Reception

Critical response
Ross Locksley from UK Anime Network praised the first volume for the story and art, calling it a "pretty fine read". Nicholas Dupree from Anime News Network also offered praise to the story, while criticizing the main character as "instantly unlikable".

Kinokuniya removal

In July 2020, the Sydney branch of Books Kinokuniya removed the series, along with six others, from its store following a written complaint by politician Connie Bonaros that they violate Australia's child pornography laws. In a statement to Anime News Network, the Sydney store stated that due to the concerns, the books were required to be classified by the Australian Classification Board. Due to this, the store could not sell the series until it was properly classified.

References

External links
 Official website 
 

2017 Japanese television series debuts
Anime and manga controversies
Crunchyroll manga
Drama anime and manga
Fuji TV dramas
Futabasha manga
Manga adapted into television series
Mystery anime and manga
Seinen manga
Shūzō Oshimi